David J. Ward (born 16 December 1953) is an English former rugby league footballer who played in the 1970s and 1980s, and coached in the 1980s and 1990s. He won a total of 12 Great Britain caps.

Background
Ward was born in Morley, West Riding of Yorkshire, England.

Playing career
Ward played  in Leeds' 16-7 victory over Widnes in the 1977 Challenge Cup Final during the 1976–77 season at Wembley Stadium, London on Saturday 7 May 1977, and won the inaugural Man of Steel Award that season.

Ward played , and scored 2-drop goals in the 14-12 victory over St. Helens in the 1978 Challenge Cup Final during the 1977–78 season at Wembley Stadium, London on Saturday 13 May 1978, in front of a crowd of 96,000, this was possibly the greatest moment of his playing career, he gave a commanding performance marshalling the Leeds team, and kicked two late drop goals to complete what was then a record comeback. Ward's Testimonial match at Leeds took place in 1982. In addition to the above Test matches, Ward played  in Great Britain’s 7-8 defeat by France in the friendly at Stadio Pier Luigi Penzo, Venice on Saturday 31 July 1982.

County Cup Final appearances
Ward played  in Leeds' 36-9 victory over Dewsbury in the 1972 Yorkshire County Cup Final during the 1972–73 season at Odsal Stadium, Bradford on Saturday 7 October 1972, played  in the 7-2 victory over Wakefield Trinity in the 1973 Yorkshire County Cup Final during the 1973–74 season at Headingley Rugby Stadium, Leeds on Saturday 20 October 1973, played  in the 16-12 victory over Featherstone Rovers in the 1976 Yorkshire County Cup Final during the 1976–77 season at Headingley Rugby Stadium, Leeds on Saturday 16 October 1976, played  in the 15-6 victory over Halifax in the 1979 Yorkshire County Cup Final during the 1979–80 season at Headingley Rugby Stadium, Leeds on Saturday 27 October 1979, and played  in the 8-7 victory over Hull Kingston Rovers in the 1980 Yorkshire County Cup Final during the 1980–81 season at Fartown Ground, Huddersfield on Saturday 8 November 1980

Player's No.6/John Player/John Player Special Trophy Final appearances
Ward came on as a substitute (replacing  Terry Clawson) in Leeds' 12-7 victory over Salford in the 1972–73 Player's No.6 Trophy Final during the 1972–73 season at Fartown Ground, Huddersfield on Saturday 24 March 1973, played  in the 4-15 defeat by Wigan in the 1982–83 John Player Trophy Final during the 1982–83 season at Elland Road, Leeds on Saturday 22 January 1983, and played  (replaced by interchange/substitute Kevin Squire) in the 18-10 victory over Widnes in the 1983–84 John Player Special Trophy Final during the 1983–84 season at Central Park, Wigan on Saturday 14 January 1984.

Coaching career
One of the more notable signings of his coaching career was when Ward brought John Gallagher to Leeds, converting the player from rugby union, but Ward was ultimately unsuccessful at Leeds, despite being in charge of one of only two full-time squads in the league at the time, the other being Wigan.

Post playing
Ward currently runs Birstall Squash Club, and has done for many years. He is the father of the rugby league footballer; Danny Ward.

References

External links
(archived by web.archive.org) Profile at leedsrugby
"A leader for Leeds as both footballer, and coach" - yorkshireeveningpost.co.uk

1953 births
Living people
Batley Bulldogs coaches
England national rugby league team captains
England national rugby league team players
English rugby league coaches
English rugby league players
Featherstone Rovers coaches
Great Britain national rugby league team players
Hunslet R.L.F.C. coaches
Leeds Rhinos coaches
Leeds Rhinos players
Sportspeople from Morley, West Yorkshire
Rugby league hookers
Rugby league players from Leeds
Warrington Wolves coaches
Workington Town players
Yorkshire rugby league team players